2017 was declared as the International Year of Sustainable Tourism for Development by the United Nations General Assembly on 4 December 2015 relating to sustainable tourism toward Sustainable Development Goals (SDGs).

References

External links 
 2017 International Year of Sustainable Tourism for Development web portal

Sustainable Tourism for Development
Sustainable tourism
2017 in international relations